Monopoly Game is the sixth recording released by the Toshiko Akiyoshi Jazz Orchestra featuring Lew Tabackin.   The three tracks, "Kyoto Paradox", Caribbean Dream" and "Urban Rhapsody" make up the three part "Suite for Koto and Jazz Orchestra" commissioned jointly by the San Francisco Jazz Festival and UCLA.  The song "Jazz Club" was commissioned by NHK Radio.

Track listing
All songs composed and arranged by Toshiko Akiyoshi:
 "Jazz Club (Opener)" – 2:56
 "Glass Ceiling" – 7:50
 "Monopoly Game" – 10:17
 "Kyoto Paradox" – 9:41
 "Caribbean Dream" – 12:30
 "Urban Rhapsody" – 10:55
 "State of the Unison" – 7:01

Personnel
Toshiko Akiyoshi – piano
Lew Tabackin – tenor saxophone, flute
Tom Christensen  – tenor saxophone, clarinet
Dave Pietro – alto saxophone, flute
Jim Snidero – alto saxophone, flute, clarinet
Scott Robinson – baritone saxophone, bass clarinet
Michael Ponella – trumpet
Andy Gravish – trumpet
John Eckert – trumpet
Joe Magnarelli – trumpet
Scott Whitfield – trombone
Luis Bonilla – trombone
Pat Hallaran – trombone
Tim Newman – bass trombone
Philippe Aerts – bass
Terry Clarke – drums

Guest
Miya Masaoka – koto

References / external links
BMG Novus J BVCJ-31003 
Monopoly Game at [ Allmusic.com]

Toshiko Akiyoshi – Lew Tabackin Big Band albums
1998 albums